Statue of King of the forest (Dilijan) is a monumental tree statue in Armenia. It is situated in the territory of Aghasi Khanjian's summer residence in Dilijan, Tavush Region.

History 
In 1966, Ara Sargsian, came with his family, to visit Aghasi Khanjian's summer residence in Dilijan. While walking around the forest, Sargsian noticed a giant tree with spread branches, resembling a human spreading his arms. In 1923, Ara Sarkissian had created the "Dragonfly" ("Greek mythology") as a divine image of the forest. In 1967, Ara Sargsian transformed it into a new look and called the King of the Forest.

In 2013, the statue was beheaded and the Dilijan Aarhus Center rebuilt the sculpture.

Description 
The king's crowned head stands on the wings of a pine tree.

Gallery

References

Buildings and structures in Tavush Province
Monuments and memorials in Armenia
Dilijan